Warren County Memorial Airport  is a county-owned public-use airport in Warren County, Tennessee, United States. It is located three nautical miles (6 km) west of the central business district of McMinnville, Tennessee. This airport is included in the National Plan of Integrated Airport Systems for 2011–2015, which categorized it as a general aviation facility.

Facilities and aircraft 
Warren County Memorial Airport covers an area of 353 acres (143 ha) at an elevation of 1,032 feet (315 m) above mean sea level. It has one runway designated 5/23 with an asphalt surface measuring 5,000 by 100 feet (1,524 x 30 m).

For the 12-month period ending April 8, 2009, the airport had 20,299 aircraft operations, an average of 55 per day: 89.5% general aviation, 10.2% air taxi, and 0.3% military. At that time there were 54 aircraft based at this airport: 85.2% single-engine, 3.7% multi-engine, 5.6% helicopter, and 5.6% ultralight.

References

External links 
 WarrenCountyMemorialAirport.com
 Aerial image as of March 1997 from USGS The National Map
 
 

Airports in Tennessee
Buildings and structures in Warren County, Tennessee
Transportation in Warren County, Tennessee